Prescott Island is one of the uninhabited Canadian Arctic islands in the territory of Nunavut. The island is situated in Peel Sound, between the Prince of Wales Island and Somerset Island.

Together with four other, smaller islands (Binstead, Lock, Pandora, and Vivian), they create a barrier at the entrance into Browne Bay on eastern Prince of Wales Island.

References

External links 
 Prescott Island in the Atlas of Canada - Toporama; Natural Resources Canada

Uninhabited islands of Qikiqtaaluk Region